Scarab Research is a research and development company specialized in recommender systems and machine learning.

History 
Scarab Research was founded in 2009 by a group of European scientists and IT engineers. Its development operations were based in Budapest, Hungary.

That time personalized recommendations offer had been a new way for returning customers to discover products that match their personal tastes, even though they may never heard of them before.

In December 2013, Scarab Research was acquired by Emarsys.

Scarab Cloud
Scarab Cloud is the name of Scarab Research's cloud-based SaaS e-commerce product recommender service.

References

Recommender systems
Collective intelligence
Companies based in Budapest
Privately held companies of Hungary
Software companies of Hungary
Hungarian brands